Washington Township is one of twenty-one townships in LaPorte County, Indiana. As of the 2010 census, its population was 1,357 and it contained 489 housing units.

Geography

References

External links
 Indiana Township Association
 United Township Association of Indiana

Townships in LaPorte County, Indiana
Townships in Indiana